Borotice may refer to places in the Czech Republic:

Borotice (Příbram District), a municipality and village in the Central Bohemian Region
Borotice (Znojmo District), a municipality and village in the South Moravian Region